Comets on Fire were an American noise rock band from Santa Cruz, California, United States. The band was formed in 1999 by guitarist and vocalist Ethan Miller and longtime friend bassist Ben Flashman, who were seeking to create rhythmically and sonically intense music that paid no attention to categorizations.

History 
The band started in 1999 and released their debut record on Alternative Tentacles (Jello Biafra's label). This album shows the influence of the Butthole Surfers, Hawkwind and the MC5. The next album Field Recordings from the Sun for Ba Da Bing label showed more growth on the record with new drummer Utrillo Kushner, as well as saxophones being added to their noise rock jams. Before the next record the band officially added Ben Chasny of Six Organs of Admittance to their lineup in 2003.  He had previously performed and recorded with them. With this line-up they got a deal on Sub Pop Records and released their critically acclaimed Blue Cathedral. The record exposed them to a whole new fan base and the record found favor with enough people for Comets on Fire to tour as the opening act for Sonic Youth, Dinosaur Jr and Mudhoney. In 2006, they released their fourth album Avatar which showed the band turning away from their psychedelic noise jams for a more subdued sound that ventures close to classic rock at times.

They are notable for their heavy use of the Echoplex, used primarily on vocals but on other instruments as well. This often renders the lyrics unintelligible; Miller claims to not remember the lyrics after putting an album together.

After completing tours for Avatar through 2008, the band went on an extended hiatus.  In the intervening period Ethan Miller began focusing attention on his Howlin' Rain project, and Noel von Harmonson joined Sic Alps.  In 2012, the band members regrouped to record as Six Organs of Admittance for a new album entitled Ascent.  In an interview with Uncut, Chasny emphasized that the group had not broken up, but that future plans were still uncertain. In June 2013, the band announced via their website that they would play the final All Tomorrow's Parties festival, in Camber Sands.

Band members
 Ethan Miller - vocals, guitar
 Noel von Harmonson - echoplex, drums
 Ben Flashman - bass
 Utrillo Kushner - drums, keyboards
 Ben Chasny - guitar

Discography

Albums
 Comets on Fire (2001)
 Field Recordings from the Sun (2002)
 Blue Cathedral (2004)
 Avatar (2006)

Other
 Live in Europa (Split LP with Major Stars, Limited 500 copies) (2003)
 Bong Voyage (Limited 800 copies) (2003)
 Cardboard Sub Pop Promo Jams (Limited 1000 copies) (2004)
 Euro Tour 5 CDR Boxset (Self Released, limited 10 copies) (2005)
 Collaboration (Split LP with Burning Star Core, Limited 1000 copies) (2005)

Related projects
 Howlin' Rain
 Six Organs of Admittance
 Colossal Yes - side project of Utrillo Kushner
 Heron Oblivion

References

External links
Comets on Fire Take Off in Exclaim! magazine
Comets on Fire at Sub Pop records
[ Allmusic entry]
Comets on Fire on Last.fm
Interview with Ethan Miller :dead link
Instagram account Official page, created in 2015

Alternative Tentacles artists
Indie rock musical groups from California